Chilean Swedes are Chilean immigrants in Sweden and citizens of Sweden who are of Chilean ancestry.

Population
It is estimated that some 50,000 people have Chilean background (first and second generation). Earlier estimations were 45,000 (2008).

History

Origins

Before the 1973 Chilean coup d'état, there were some 90 Chileans in Sweden. The early stages of mass migration mainly consisted of politicians, militants, intellectuals and other left-leaning elements seeking political refuge, but recent arrivals usually involve working-class Chileans in search of better living conditions for themselves and their families. Today many live in the bigger cities such as Gothenburg, Malmö and Stockholm. Chilean Swedes are the largest and most prominent group among Latin American communities residing in Sweden.

The Coup 1973
Chilean people started immigrating in the 1970s in order to escape the dictatorship of Augusto Pinochet. Sweden was known to be a social democratic country and the government allowed refugees to come to Sweden. But for many the time adapting to the new country was difficult. Language barriers, colder weather and monopolies on TV, radio and alcohol sales, for example, were a huge contrast to Chile. Many who came to Sweden continued to support the overthrown government of Salvador Allende. When Sweden was scheduled to play a Davis Cup tennis match against Chile in 1975, a large protest movement instigated by the Chilean diaspora sought to boycott the match and have it cancelled. The Hoola Bandoola Band even wrote a song titled "Stoppa matchen" ("Stop the match"). Almost 10,000 people demonstrated against the decision to play the match, which was eventually held as scheduled, but without spectators. When Milton Friedman received his Nobel Prize in 1976, similar protests organized both by Swedes and Chileans were once again seen on the streets.

After the coup
During the 1980s, after Pinochet's economic reforms many poverty-stricken Chileans left their home country in hope to seek better opportunities in Sweden, where there was already a sizable presence of Chileans arrived in the previous decade. Some helped the newly arrived so they could integrate in the Swedish society. For a short period immigration from Chile increased after the 1970s and once again peaked. Nevertheless, conservative groups started to debate the reasons behind the massive arrival of Chileans in Sweden, and members of radical right organizations founded the Chilean-Swedish Society (Svensk-Chilenska Sällskapet), in order to make good publicity of the Pinochet regime.

Today Chile is considered to be democratic and prosperous by Latin American standards, which has decreased immigration after the installation of a democratic government in 1990. Chileans who want to visit Sweden can stay three months without a visa thanks to diplomatic agreements between the countries. On the other hand, for Chileans who want to stay permanently in Sweden, it has become much more difficult for them to gain a permanent visa.

Since the 1990s, migration from Chile to Sweden has declined following restoration of Chilean democracy and the economy of Chile growing more successful.

The group is considered today to be one of the most well-integrated within Swedish society. This perception of assimilation resulted in Sveriges Radio (Swedish Public Radio) to announce that they would stop broadcasting news in Spanish in 2005 . They are the largest Latin American group in Sweden and celebrate their culture in ways such as commemorating Chilean National Days or Fiestas Patrias. Thus they keep alive Chilean folk traditions such as the cueca and huaso costumes.

Notable people

 List of notable people

 Luciano Astudillo, politician active in the Social Democratic Party
 Sergio Badilla Castillo, poet
 Erik Bongcam-Rudloff, biologist and scientist
 Sebastian Castro-Tello, football/soccer player
 Matias Concha, football/soccer player
 Miiko Albornoz, football/soccer player
 Malin Diaz, football/soccer player
 Rossana Dinamarca, politician, member of parliament, active in the Left Party
 Daniel Espinosa, film director, Chilean father
 Alvaro Estrella, singer and dancer
 Daniela Lincoln Saavedra, female long jumper
 Leopoldo Méndez, DJ and singer
 Pablo Piñones-Arce, football/soccer player
 Paul Rey, singer
 Mauricio Rojas, former leftist (MIR) now politician for Folkpartiet (Swedish Liberal Party)
 America Vera Zavala, politician, active in the Left Party
 The Latin Kings, rap group from Stockholm
 Stor, rapper from Stockholm
 Felipe Leiva Wenger, rapper

See also
 Chile–Sweden relations

References

External links
 Chileans in Sweden

Ethnic groups in Sweden
 
Sweden